Paul Leslie Snider (April 15, 1951 – August 14, 1980) was a Canadian nightclub promoter and pimp who murdered his estranged wife, Playboy model and actress Dorothy Stratten. Following her murder, Snider killed himself.

Biography 
Snider was born in Vancouver. By the mid-1970s, he was a nightclub promoter and pimp. In 1977, he met Dorothy Stratten at a Vancouver-area Dairy Queen, where she was working part-time while still attending high school and groomed her  to become a model as well as his lover. In 1979, Snider sent professionally taken nude photographs of Stratten to Playboy magazine and she was chosen as a Playmate for the month of August that year. Snider and Stratten moved to Los Angeles and married on June 1 in Las Vegas.

While Stratten worked as a "bunny" at the Century City Playboy Club, and was cast in a few television and film roles, Snider had engaged in numerous get-rich-quick schemes, including building and selling exercise benches. Stratten helped support Snider financially throughout their short marriage.

In 1980, Stratten was named Playboys Playmate of the Year and was cast in the movie They All Laughed (1981) directed by Peter Bogdanovich, with whom she began an affair. Stratten and Snider separated and he hired a private investigator to follow her.

Death 
On August 14, 1980, Dorothy Stratten was shot and killed in the West Los Angeles house she had shared with Snider, whose body was found next to hers. Police believed Snider raped and murdered Stratten, and then killed himself with the same shotgun.

Snider's remains are buried at Schara Tzedeck Cemetery in New Westminster, British Columbia.

In popular culture 
Snider has been portrayed in three films. The first was a made-for-television movie about the murder titled Death of a Centerfold: The Dorothy Stratten Story (1981), which starred Jamie Lee Curtis as Stratten and Bruce Weitz as Snider. Bob Fosse's film Star 80 (1983) dramatized Stratten's life and death. Mariel Hemingway played Stratten, and Eric Roberts portrayed Snider. In the series Welcome to Chippendales, he was played by Dan Stevens.

References

External links 

1951 births
1980 deaths
1980 murders in the United States
1980 suicides
20th-century Canadian criminals
Burials in British Columbia
Canadian Jews
Canadian rapists
Canadian male criminals
Canadian murderers
Crime in California
Deaths by firearm in California
Domestic violence in the United States
Male murderers
Murder–suicides in California
People from Vancouver
Suicides by firearm in California
Violence against women in the United States